Marist College Ashgrove (abbreviated as MCA) is an independent Roman Catholic day and boarding primary and secondary school for boys, located in the northern Brisbane suburb of Ashgrove, in Queensland, Australia. The college caters for students from Year 5 to Year 12.

History
Marist College Ashgrove was founded by the Marist Brothers as a day and boarding College for boys on 17 March 1940.
Enrolment preferences are given to baptised Catholics, with participation in the Church given more consideration.

The College educates 1700 students from Years 5 to 12, 170 of whom are boarders, and provides wide-ranging programs encompassing academics, the visual and performing arts, sports and service projects.

The ethos and mission of the College are influenced by the founder of the Marist Brothers, Saint Marcellin Champagnat.

Campus

The college is situated on a  campus and includes such facilities as:
 McMahon Oval – used for both Rugby Union and cricket – featuring the John Eales Grandstand and Matthew Hayden scoreboard
 Science Block
 8 cricket / rugby union / soccer ovals containing:
 2 multi-purpose courts basketball/tennis
 6 floodlit hard tennis courts
 Long jump/triple jump training track
 Shot put/discus/javelin stations
 Gymnasium – capacity for 2 indoor basketball courts/8 badminton courts
 2 outdoor basketball courts
 Weight room
 Matthew Hayden cricket training complex
 Olympic sized heated swimming pool with grandstand
 A performing and visual arts center which houses a 340-seat theatre
 Three distinct houses that contain the five boarding residences
 Hall of Fame

Houses

In 1993, the House system was established. There are eight houses at Marist College Ashgrove:
 Foley
 Ephrem
 Gilroy
 Harold 
 Ignatius
 Slattery
 Ridley
 Rush

Sport 
Marist College Ashgrove is a member of the Associated Independent Colleges (AIC).

AIC premierships 
Marist College Ashgrove has won the following AIC premierships.

 Athletics (12) - 1999, 2003, 2004, 2005, 2015, 2016, 2017, 2018, 2019, 2020, 2021, 2022
 Basketball (10) - 1999, 2000, 2002, 2003, 2004, 2005, 2006, 2016, 2017, 2018
 Cricket (9) - 2003, 2005, 2009, 2010, 2011, 2012, 2014, 2015, 2018
 Cross Country (13) - 2002, 2005, 2008, 2009, 2010, 2012, 2014, 2017, 2018, 2019, 2020, 2021, 2022
 Rugby (14) - 1999, 2001, 2002, 2003, 2004, 2005, 2006, 2007, 2009, 2011, 2017, 2018, 2019, 2020
 Soccer (10) - 2000, 2003, 2004, 2008, 2009, 2010, 2011, 2019, 2020, 2021
 Swimming (13) - 2001, 2002, 2003, 2005, 2006, 2007, 2008, 2009, 2010, 2011, 2013, 2015, 2016
 Tennis (7) - 2001, 2003, 2007, 2008, 2009, 2010, 2011
 Volleyball (6) - 2004, 2007, 2009, 2010, 2017, 2021
 Esports (1) - 2022

Boarding school

Marist College Ashgrove offers a boarding school for students from Years 6 to 12 and can cater for up to 220 boarders. The boarding community includes many students from the Greater Brisbane Region and South East Queensland, along with many country students from Outback Queensland and regional Australia. International students also board from the Asia-Pacific region from countries and territories such as Papua New Guinea, the Solomon Islands and Hong Kong.

Crest and motto

The crest of the college is based on the design of the crest of St Joseph's College, Hunters Hill in Sydney. The four quadrants of the shield are filled with: the Marist Monogram with its twelve stars in the top left; the Southern Cross in the top right; the MCA logo in the bottom left; and the lamp and book representing learning in the bottom right.

The college's motto is "Viriliter Age", which translates from Latin to "Act Courageously". The motto was adopted in 1957 and is displayed above the crest.

Notable alumni

Arts
 Michael Bauer — novelist
 Andrew McGahan — novelist
 Humphrey McQueen — historian and author
 Ray Meagher — actor

Business
 Robert Deakin — Australian social entrepreneur and cyber security expert
 Bill Ludwig — trade union leader

Medicine
 Michael Gabbett — clinical geneticist, paediatrician and academic

Music
 Joel Adams — pop singer-songwriter

Law
 David Jackson — Australian Federal Court judge
 Nathan Jarro — Queensland District Court judge
 Martin Moynihan — former Queensland Supreme Court judge

Politics
 Sir Julius Chan — former Prime Minister of Papua New Guinea
 Kevin Rudd — former Prime Minister of Australia
 Taniela (Dan) Tufui — former Chief Secretary to the Government of Tonga and Secretary to Cabinet
 Peter Lawlor — former Labor Member for Southport

Religion
 James Foley — former Catholic Bishop of Cairns
 Brian Heenan — former Catholic Bishop of Rockhampton

Sport
 Michael Bohl — former Commonwealth Games swimmer and Australian Olympic coach
 Corey Brown — football player
 Charlie Cameron — AFL player with the Brisbane Lions
 John Connolly — former Wallabies coach
 Des Connor — former rugby union player
 Alex Cusack — Irish national cricket player
 John Eales — rugby union player and former captain of the Australian Wallabies
 Pietro Figlioli — Olympian – Water Polo
 Ryan Fisher — triathlete and Olympian
 Nick Frisby — rugby union player - scrumhalf - Queensland Reds
 Andrew Grant — volleyball player and Olympian
 Richard Graham — Queensland Reds coach and Western Force coach
 Ben Griffin — football player
 Matthew Hayden — Australian and Queensland cricketer
 Bryce Hegarty — rugby union player - flyhalf - NSW Waratahs
 Anthony Herbert — former rugby union player
 Daniel Herbert — former rugby union player
 Pat Howard — Australian rugby union coach
 Robert (Bob) Honan — former Australian national rugby union and rugby league player
 Russell Johnstone — equestrian and Olympian
 Lachlan Keeffe — AFL player with Greater Western Sydney
 Stephen Lee — speed skater and Olympian
 Brendan McKibbin — rugby union player – scrum half – NSW Waratahs
 Peter McPhee — cricket player
 Paul Miller — boxer and Olympian
 Brendan Moon — former rugby union player for the Queensland Reds
 Sean O'Brien — Australian professional windsurfer and Olympic Sailing team coach
 Lev Susany — Australian powerlifter and Commonwealth record holder
 Alex Toolis — rugby union player - lock - Edinburgh Rugby, Melbourne Rebels
 Ben Toolis — rugby union player - lock - Edinburgh Rugby
 Alex Rokobaro — rugby union player - Stade Francais, Melbourne Rebels
 Billy Walters — rugby league player

See also

 List of schools in Queensland
 List of boarding schools in Australia
 List of Marist Brothers schools

References

External links

Boys' schools in Queensland
Boarding schools in Queensland
Educational institutions established in 1940
Rock Eisteddfod Challenge participants
Catholic boarding schools in Australia
Catholic primary schools in Brisbane
Catholic secondary schools in Brisbane
Association of Marist Schools of Australia
Ashgrove, Queensland
1940 establishments in Australia